Merelaniite is a mineral having the formula Mo4Pb4VSbS15.  It is a molybdenum-essential member of the cylindrite group.  The first and thus far only samples of merelaniite have been found in the Merelani Tanzanite Deposit, located in the Lelatema Mountains of Tanzania.

References

Molybdenum minerals
Lead minerals
Vanadium minerals
Antimonide minerals
Sulfide minerals